The 2013 American Athletic Conference men's soccer tournament was the first postseason tournament in men's soccer for the American Athletic Conference (the American) following the 2013 split of the original Big East Conference along football lines. The "Big East" name was purchased by the seven non-FBS football schools of the original conference, while the Big East charter was retained by the FBS schools now operating as The American. Including the history of the original Big East, which is jointly claimed by both successor conferences, this was The American's 18th men's soccer tournament.

The tournament decided the American Athletic Conference champion and guaranteed representative into the 2013 NCAA Division I Men's Soccer Championship. Held at the Toyota Stadium in Frisco, Texas, the South Florida Bulls won the title.

Qualification

Bracket

Schedule

Quarterfinals

Semifinals

American Championship

All-Tournament team
Omar Vallejo, UCF
Adria Beso Marco, Connecticut
Andre Blake, Connecticut
Sergio Campbell, Connecticut
Cyle Larin, Connecticut
David Greczek, Rutgers
Samuel Hosseini, South Florida
Edwin Moalosi, South Florida (most outstanding offensive player)
Duane Muckette, South Florida
Brentton Muhammad, South Florida (most outstanding defensive player)
Stiven Salinas, South Florida

See also 
 American Athletic Conference
 2013 American Athletic Conference men's soccer season
 2013 NCAA Division I men's soccer season
 2013 NCAA Division I Men's Soccer Championship

References 

American Athletic Conference Men's Soccer Tournament

American Athletic Conference Men's Soccer Tournament